The little pygmy perch (Nannoperca pygmaea) is a freshwater ray finned fish, a temperate perch from the family Percichthyidae endemic to southwestern Western Australia. It is known from just four sites in the Denmark catchment. It is found in tannin stained, acidic and shallow streams in woodland dominated by Melaleuca rhaphiophylla.

References

little pygmy perch
Freshwater fish of Western Australia
little pygmy perch